"Blistered" is a song recorded by American country music artist Johnny Cash. It was released in October 1969 as the first single from his album Hello, I'm Johnny Cash. The song peaked at #4 on the Billboard Hot Country Singles chart. It also reached #1 on the RPM Country Tracks chart in Canada.  The song was written by Billy Ed Wheeler.

"Blistered" was also featured as an album track on "And Then Along Comes...The Association" (Valiant Records, June, 1966). This version featured Russ Giguere on vocals and had a quick-tempo rock and roll sound.

Chart performance

References

1969 singles
1969 songs
Johnny Cash songs
Song recordings produced by Bob Johnston
Columbia Records singles
Songs written by Billy Edd Wheeler